Mate Bohu Kari Nei Jaa is a 2011 Oriya film written and directed by Bikash Das. It is about Odias who are rooted to their culture even after being out of the country for decades.

Plot
The story is based on two families living in Bangkok.

Cast
Siddhanta Mahapatra		
Dipen		
Aishwarya Pathi		
Malabika Bhatacharya		
Mihir Das		
Raza Murad		
Hadu		
Aparajita Mohanty		
Pushpa Panda		
Asrumochan Mohanty

Soundtrack

References

External links 
 

2011 films
2010s Odia-language films
Films set in Bangkok